The Tennessee Republican Party (TRP or TNGOP) is the affiliate of the United States Republican Party in Tennessee. Since the mid-1960s, the state 
has become increasingly Republican. The current chairman of the Republican Party of Tennessee is Scott Golden. It is currently the dominant party in the state, controlling the majority of Tennessee's U.S. House seats, both U.S. Senate seats, both houses of the state legislature, and the governorship.

History
Upon its entry into the Union in 1796 Tennessee was strongly Democratic-Republican. Tennessee became a two-party system for more than 20 years during the Jacksonian era. The Democratic Party was formed by Jackson followers and this party was dominant against the rival Whig Party led by Henry Clay. But in 1835, there was a turn in power of party and a Whig governor was elected. Tennessee after the American Civil War was part of the Democratic South for about a century. East Tennessee however remained strongly Republican. Even though the state was predominantly Democratic, two different presidential elections won the state of Tennessee in 1920 and 1928. In the 1960s and 1970s Republicans made a push into the Democratic power when in 1966, Howard Baker was elected US senator. Then again Republicans made another push, when Winfield Dunn was elected governor, the first Republican Governor in over 50 years.

Leadership and staff
The Tennessee Republican Party has had five chairmen since 2005. On December 11, 2004, the State Executive Committee unanimously elected Bob Davis as Chairman of the Tennessee Republican Party to serve for the calendar years 2005 and 2006. He was subsequently elected to a second two-year term, 2007 and 2008, but resigned from the chairmanship in August 2007 to become Senior Adviser to presidential candidate Fred Thompson. The party's State Executive Committee then chose Robin Smith, former chairman of the Hamilton County Republican Party and vice chairman of the Tennessee GOP under Davis, to complete Davis's two-year term.

Republicans won a victory in Tennessee's 2008 elections, when the party won majorities in both houses of the Tennessee General Assembly for the first time since the Reconstruction Era election of 1868. Smith was unanimously re-elected at the end of 2008 to a full two-year term as chairman for calendar years 2009 and 2010. In April 2009, Smith announced her resignation in order to run for Congress in Tennessee's 3rd congressional district in the August 2010 Republican primary.

Staff
The Chairman of the Republican Party of Tennessee is Scott Golden, who was elected on December 3, 2016. Tyler Burns serves as the Political Director and Mandy Devaney as the Communications Director.

Current elected officials
The Tennessee Republican Party controls the governor's office and a majority in the Tennessee Senate and the Tennessee House of Representatives. Republicans hold both of the state's U.S. Senate seats and 8 of the state's 9 U.S. House seats.

Members of Congress

U.S. Senate

U.S. House of Representatives
Diana Harshbarger, 1st District
Tim Burchett, 2nd District
Chuck Fleischmann, 3rd District
Scott DesJarlais, 4th District
Andy Ogles, 5th District
John Rose, 6th District
Mark Green, 7th District
David Kustoff, 8th District

Statewide offices

Governor: Bill Lee
Lieutenant Governor: Randy McNally

Legislative leadership
Speaker of the Senate/Lt. Governor: Randy McNally
Speaker of the House: Cameron Sexton

Tennessee state senate
Steve Southerland, District 1
Art Swann, District 2
Rusty Crowe, District 3
Jon Lundberg, District 4
Lt. Gov. Randy McNally, District 5
Becky Duncan Massey, District 6
Richard Briggs, District 7
Frank Niceley, District 8
Mike Bell, District 9
Todd Gardenhire, District 10
Bo Watson, District 11
Ken Yager, District 12
Bill Ketron, District 13
Jim Tracy, District 14
Janice Bowling, District 16
Mark Pody, District 17
Ferrell Haile, District 18
Steven Dickerson, District 20
Rosalind Kurita, District 22
Jack Johnson, District 23
John Stevens, District 24
Kerry Roberts, District 25
Dolores Gresham, District 26
Joey Hensley, District 28
Brian Kelsey, District 31

Tennessee state house
Jon Lundberg - District 1
Tony Shipley - District 2
Timothy Hill - District 3
David Hawk - District 5
James (Micah) Van Huss - District 6
Matthew Hill - District 7
Art Swann - District 8
Michael Harrison - District 9
Tilman Goins - District 10
Jeremy Faison - District 11
Dale Carr - District 12
Eddie Smith - District 13
Ryan Haynes - District 14
Bill Dunn - District 16
Andrew Farmer - District 17
Steve Hall - District 18
Harry Brook - District 19
Bob Ramsey - District 20
Jimmy Matlock - District 21
Eric Watson - District 22
John Forgety - District 23
Kevin Brooks - District 24
Cameron Sexton - District 25
Gerald McCormick - District 26
Richard Floyd - District 27
Mike Carter, District 29
Vince Dean - District 30
Ron Travis - District 31
Kent Calfee - District 32
John Ragan - District 33
Rick Womick - District 34
Dennis E. Roach - District 35
Dennis Powers - District 36
Dawn White, District 37
Kelly Keisling - District 38
David Alexander - District 39
Terri Lynn Weaver - District 40
Ryan Williams - District 42
Paul Sherrell - District 43
William Lamberth, District 44
Courtney Rogers - District 45
Mark Pody - District 46
Judd Matheny - District 47
Bryan Terry - District 48
Mike Sparks - District 49
Speaker Beth Harwell - District 56
Susan Lynn - District 57
Charles Michael Sargent - District 61
Pat Marsh - District 62
Glen Casada - District 63
Sheila Butt - District 64
Sam Whitson, District 65
Joshua Evans - District 66
Curtis Johnson - District 68
Michael Curcio - District 69
Barry Doss - District 70
Vance Dennis - District 71
Steve McDaniel - District 72
Jimmy Eldridge - District 73
Jay Reedy - District 74
Tim Wirgau - District 75
Andy Holt - District 76
Bill Sanderson - District 77
Mary Littleton - District 78
Curtis Halford - District 79
Debra Moody, District 81
Mark White - District 83
Roger Kane, District 89
Billy Spivey, District 92
Barrett Rich - District 94
 - District 95
Jim Coley - District 97
Ron Lollar - District 99

Current structure
Here is the structure of the party as of December 2011

Elected officers of the state committee
State Chairman
Vice-chairman
Secretary
Treasurer
Vice-Treasurer
National Committeewoman
National Committeeman
General Counsel

State executive committee
The state executive committee (SEC) operates as the governing body for the state party. They establish rules and measures that best promote the success of the Republican Party and broadening of its base. The SEC serves as the TRP's state primary board and establishes to guide and direct County Republican Parties.  One man and one woman are elected from each state senate  district.
33 districts
66 total representatives of the TRP
33 are male
33 are female

Notable Tennessee Republicans
Fred Thompson
Bill Frist
Don Sundquist
Howard Baker
Bill Brock
Winfield Dunn
Lamar Alexander
Bob Corker

Controversial comment
In 2008, the Tennessee Republican Party issued a press release that featured a photo of Senator Obama dressed in traditional Kenya clothing that the TN GOP called "Muslim attire" and used Obama's middle name "Hussein." Both Senator John McCain and State Democratic Chairman Gray Sasser decried the press release.

Corruption
In July 2009 state senator Paul Stanley resigned after being caught in a sexual relationship with a 22-year-old intern. Paul Stanley was known for running for family values. Stanley resigned because he wanted to focus more on his family and better that since his indiscretions. He was quoted saying "And just because I fell far short of what God's standard was for me and my wife, doesn't mean that that standard is reduced in the least bit."
Keith Westmoreland a Republican Tennessee State Representative was arrested on 7 felony counts of lewd and exposing himself to girls under the age 16. He committed suicide before he could be prosecuted.
Operation Tennessee Waltz was a statewide bribery sting, where 3 Democratic Senators and 1 Republican Representative were either convicted or pleaded guilty. 8 other people also either pleaded guilty or were convicted.

Past elections
In 2008 the Republican won a historic victory, when the party won majorities in both houses of the Tennessee General Assembly for the first time since the reconstruction era election of 1868.

Presidential elections
Like other Southern states, before 1960s Tennessee was a solid state of the Democratic Party. Since 1972 the Republican Party has won Tennessee in 7 out of 11 elections. It won Tennessee only except 1976, 1992 and 1996.

Past Republican governors
Edward H. East 1865
William G. Brownlow 1865-1869
Dewitt C. Senter 1869-1871
Alvin Hawkins 1881-1883
Ben W. Hooper 1911-1915
Alfred A. Taylor  1921-1923
Winfield Dunn  1971-1975
Lamar Alexander  1979-1987
Don Sundquist  1995-2003
Bill Haslam  2011–2019

Coalitions
African American Development Council
College Republicans
Republican Jewish Coalition
Republican National Hispanic Assembly of Tennessee
Teenage Republicans
Young Republicans
Tennessee Federation of Republican Women

Former Chairmen
Thomas W. Beasley, from 1977 to 1981.
Jim Burnett, from 1995 to 1999.
Chip Saltsman, from 1999 to 2001.
Beth Harwell, from 2001 to 2004.
Bob Davis, from 2005 to August 2007.
Robin Smith, from  August 4, 2007, to May 30, 2009.
Chris Devaney, from 2009 to 2015
Ryan Haynes, from 2015 to 2016.

References

External links
Tennessee Republican Party
Tennessee Federation of Republican Women
Tennessee Federation of College Republicans
Tennessee Young Republican Federation
Republican Platform
Tennessee Teenage Republicans
 Republican Jewish Federation

Republican Party
Tennessee